The Central Bank Center (formerly known as Lexington Center) is an entertainment, convention and sports complex located on an  site in downtown Lexington, Kentucky. It features a convention center, a shopping mall, the Hyatt Regency Hotel, and Rupp Arena. It opened in 1976.

On January 27, 2020, it was announced that Lexington Center's overall naming rights were sold to Central Bank, a local community bank, by the Lexington Center Corporation and JMI Sports, which handles the multimedia rights for both the LCC and the University of Kentucky. The Rupp name will continue to receive primacy in the fourteen-year agreement for the arena portion of the complex, and be known as "Rupp Arena at Central Bank Center".

Components

 Rupp Arena, which at its opening in 1976 was the world's largest indoor arena, originally held 24,000. For much of the next 40-plus years, it remained the largest (by capacity) in the U.S. built specifically for basketball. During the 2019 basketball offseason, the capacity was reduced to 20,545 when nearly half of the original upper-level bleachers were replaced with chairback seating.
 The 1,000-seat Lexington Opera House, located at the corner of Broadway and Short Streets.
 A 366-room Hyatt Regency Hotel.
 A  convention center.
  of meeting rooms and ballrooms. 
 Triangle Park

See also
 Cityscape of Lexington, Kentucky

References

External links
Official website
Official website of Rupp Arena
Official website of the Lexington Opera House
Official website of Triangle Park
Hyatt Regency Lexington

Convention centers in Kentucky
Commercial buildings in Lexington, Kentucky
Tourist attractions in Lexington, Kentucky
Event venues established in 1976